Lamport is a surname. Notable people with the surname include:

Allan A. Lamport, Mayor of Toronto
Felicia Lamport (1916–1999), American poet and satirist
Leslie Lamport, American computer scientist
Paul H. Lamport (1907–1984), American businessman
Stephen Lamport, British diplomat
William Lamport (1615–1659), Irish Catholic adventurer
William H. Lamport (1811–1891), American politician
William James Lamport, co-founder of the Lamport and Holt shipping line